Dražice is a village in Croatia. Dražice is located south of Podkilavac and west of Podhum. Dražice has a median population age of 42.3.

References

Populated places in Primorje-Gorski Kotar County